L is the second studio album by British progressive rock musician Steve Hillage.

It was recorded primarily in New York, at the Secret Sound, Woodstock, N.Y., and was produced and engineered by Todd Rundgren, using musicians from Todd Rundgren's band Utopia and others.

According to liner notes supplied with the US pressing, Rundgren had only just become aware of Hillage, and following a letter from Hillage to Rundgren, and a reply from Rundgren, Hillage travelled to New York to meet, and the agreement to work together flowed from that.

The cover features a clean-shaven Hillage (most of the publicity shots of Hillage during the 1970s show him with a full beard) holding his guitar, brightly backlit.

Unusually for Hillage, half the songs on this album are covers. "Hurdy Gurdy Man" was written by Donovan, "Om Nama Shivaya" is based on a traditional Hindu mantra, and "It's All Too Much" was written by George Harrison, and originally appeared on the 1969 Beatles album, Yellow Submarine.

The original Virgin catalogue number for this album on vinyl was V2066.  An American pressing was issued on Atlantic Records, catalogue number SD 18205.

In the Q & Mojo Classic Special Edition Pink Floyd & The Story of Prog Rock, the album came 28th in its list of "40 Cosmic Rock Albums".

Charts 
The album entered the UK charts on 16 October 1976, where it stayed for 12 weeks, hitting a peak of number 10.  This was the most successful of Steve Hillage's solo albums, the next most successful being Motivation Radio and Green, which reached numbers 28 and 30, respectively.

Track listing 

Side one
 "Hurdy Gurdy Man" (Donovan) – 6:32
 "Hurdy Gurdy Glissando" (Miquette Giraudy, Steve Hillage) – 8:54
 "Electrick Gypsies" (Hillage) – 6:24

Side two
 "Om Nama Shivaya" (lyrics: Uma Nanda; music: Kesar Singh Narula) – 3:33
 "Lunar Musick Suite" (Giraudy, Hillage) – 11:59
 "It's All Too Much" (George Harrison) – 6:26

Personnel 
 Steve Hillage – guitar, vocals, EMS VCS 3, ARP Pro Soloist, shehnai
 Miquette Giraudy – lady voice, Isis vibes
 Roger Powell – RMI keyboard computer, piano, Moog synthesizer
 Kasim Sulton – bass guitar
 John Wilcox – drums
 Don Cherry – trumpet, voices, bells, tambura
 Larry Karush – tabla
 Sonja Malkine – 15th century hurdy-gurdy

References 

1976 albums
Steve Hillage albums
Albums produced by Todd Rundgren
Virgin Records albums